Járnkné may refer to:
 Glúniairn, a Norse-Gael king of Dublin of the Uí Ímair
 Glúniarann, a Viking leader who may have reigned as King of Dublin